The Heistse Pijl is a single-day road bicycle race held annually in June around the municipality of Heist-op-den-Berg, Belgium. Since 2016, the race is organized as a 1.1 event on the UCI Europe Tour.

Winners

External links
 

UCI Europe Tour races
Recurring sporting events established in 1947
1947 establishments in Belgium
Cycle races in Belgium
Sport in Heist-op-den-Berg